Lullubi, Lulubi (: Lu-lu-bi, : Lu-lu-biki "Country of the Lullubi"), more commonly known as Lullu, were a group of tribes during the 3rd millennium BC, from a region known as Lulubum, now the Sharazor plain of the Zagros Mountains of modern Iran, Lullubi was neighbour and sometimes ally with the Simurrum kingdom. Frayne (1990) identified their city Lulubuna or Luluban with the region's modern town of Halabja.

The language of the Lullubi is regarded as an unclassified language because it is unattested. The term Lullubi though, appears to be of Hurrian origin.

Historical references

Legends
The early Sumerian legend "Lugalbanda and the Anzud Bird", set in the reign of Enmerkar of Uruk, alludes to the "mountains of Lulubi" as being where the character of Lugalbanda encounters the gigantic Anzû bird while searching for the rest of Enmerkar's army en route to siege Aratta.

Akkadian empire and Gutian dynasty

Lullubum appears in historical times as one of the lands Sargon the Great subjugated within his Akkadian Empire, along with the neighboring province of Gutium, which was probably of the same origin as the Lullubi. Sargon's grandson Naram Sin defeated the Lullubi and their king Satuni, and had his famous victory stele made in commemoration:

After the Akkadian Empire fell to the Gutians, the Lullubians rebelled against the Gutian king Erridupizir, according to the latter's inscriptions:

Neo-Sumerian Empire

Following the Gutian period, the Neo-Sumerian Empire (Ur-III) ruler Shulgi is said to have raided Lullubi at least 9 times; by the time of Amar-Sin, Lullubians formed a contingent in the military of Ur, suggesting that the region was then under Neo-Sumerian control.

Another famous rock relief depicting the Lullubian king Anubanini with the Assyrian-Babylonian goddess Ishtar, captives in tow, is now thought to date to the Ur-III period; however, a later Babylonian legendary retelling of the exploits of Sargon the Great mentions Anubanini as one of his opponents.

Babylonian and Assyrian interactions
In the following (second) millennium BC, the term "Lullubi" or "Lullu" seems to have become a generic Babylonian/Assyrian term for "highlander", while the original region of Lullubi was also known as Zamua. However, the "land of Lullubi" makes a reappearance in the late 12th century BC, when both Nebuchadnezzar I of Babylon (in c. 1120 BC) and Tiglath-Pileser I of Assyria (in 1113 BC) claim to have subdued it. Neo-Assyrian kings of the following centuries also recorded campaigns and conquests in the area of Lullubum / Zamua. Most notably, Ashur-nasir-pal II had to suppress a revolt among the Lullubian / Zamuan chiefs in 881 BC, during which they constructed a wall in the Bazian pass (between modern Kirkuk and Sulaymaniyah) in a failed attempt to keep the Assyrians out.

They were said to have had 19 walled cities in their land, as well as a large supply of horses, cattle, metals, textiles and wine, which were carried off by Ashur-nasir-pal.  Local chiefs or governors of the Zamua region continued to be mentioned down to the end of Esarhaddon's reign (669 BC).

Representations

In depictions of them, the Lullubi are represented as warlike mountain people. The Lullubi are often shown bare-chested and wearing animal skins. They have short beards, their hair is long and worn in a thick braid, as can be seen on the Victory Stele of Naram-Sin.

Rulers

Rulers of the Lullubi kingdom:
 Immashkush (c. 2400 BC)
 Anubanini (c. 2350 BC) he ordered to make an inscription on the rock near Sar-e Pol-e Zahab.
 Satuni (c. 2270 BC contemporary with Naram-Sin king of Akkad and Khita king of Awan)
 Irib (c. 2037 BC)
 Darianam (c. 2000 BC)
 Ikki (precise dates unknown)
 Tar ... duni (precise dates unknown) son of Ikki. His inscription is found not far from the inscription of Anubanini.
 Nur-Adad (c. 881 – 880 BC)
 Zabini (c. 881 BC)
 Hubaia (c. 830 BC) vassal of Assyrians
 Dada (c. 715 BC)
 Larkutla (c. 675 BC)

Lullubi rock reliefs
Various Lullubian reliefs can be seen in the area of Sar-e Pol-e Zohab, the best preserved of which is the Anubanini rock relief. They all show a ruler trampling an enemy, and most also show a deity facing the ruler. Another relief can be found about 200 meters away, in a style similar to the Anubanini relief, but this time with a beardless ruler. The attribution to a specific ruler remains uncertain.

Anubanini rock relief

Other Lullubi reliefs

See also 

 Anobanini rock relief
 Zamua
 Tell Kunara

References

Sources
 Sar-e Pol-e Zahab
 Lullubi
 Qashqai, Hamidreza, Chronicle of early Iran history, Tehran, Avegan press, 2011 (in Persian: گاهنمای سپیده دم تاریخ در ایران )
 Cameron, George, "History of Early Iran", Chicago, 1936 (repr., Chicago, 1969; tr. E.-J. Levin, L’histoire de l’Iran antique, Paris, 1937; tr. H. Anusheh, ایران در سپیده دم تاریخ, Tehran, 1993)
 D’yakonov, I. M., "Istoriya Midii ot drevenĭshikh vremen do kontsa IV beka de e.E" (The history of Media from ancient times to the end of the 4th century BCE), Moscow and Leningrad, 1956; tr. Karim Kešāvarz as Tāriḵ-e Mād, Tehran, 1966.
 The Cambridge History of Iran
 Hinz, W., "The Lost World of Elam", London, 1972 (tr. F. Firuznia, دنیای گمشده ایلام, Tehran, 1992)
 The Cambridge Ancient History
 Majidzadeh, Yusef, "History and civilization of Elam", Tehran, Iran University Press, 1991.
 Majidzadeh, Yusef, "History and civilization of Mesopotamia", Tehran, Iran University Press, 1997, vol.1.
 Legrain, Leon, "Historical Fragments", Philadelphia, The University of Pennsylvania Museum Publications of the Babylonian Section, vol. XIII, 1922.
 Vallat, Francois. Elam: The History of Elam. Encyclopaedia Iranica, vol. VIII pp. 301-313. London/New York, 1998.

Akkadian Empire
Ancient history of Iran
History of Lorestan Province
Unclassified languages of Asia